Protorygma is an extinct genus of flies in the family Sepsidae.

Species
†Protorygma electricum Hennig, 1965

References

Sepsidae
Diptera of Europe
Prehistoric insects of Europe
Baltic amber
Brachycera genera
Fossil taxa described in 1965
Taxa named by Willi Hennig